Somsdorf is a municipal subdivision of Freital in Sächsische Schweiz-Osterzgebirge district. It lies in the west of Freital, between the Rote Weißeritz and the Wilde Weißeritz.

History 
The village was first mentioned in 1350. Since 1 January 1974, Somsdorf is a municipal subdivision of Freital.

Residents

External links 
 Website of Somsdorf (German)
 Somsdorf in Historisches Ortsverzeichnis von Sachsen (German)

References 

Former municipalities in Saxony
Freital